The 12569 / 70 Jainagar Anand Vihar Garib Rath Express is a Superfast Express train of the Garib Rath series belonging to Indian Railways - East Central Railway zone that runs between Jainagar and Anand Vihar Terminal in India.
When inaugurated, The service of this train was between Darbhanga to Hazrat Nizamuddin which afterwards has been extended to Jainagar from Darbhanga as there was heavy demand of passengers for a direct train from Jainagar to Hazrat Nizamuddin and on the other end to Anand Vihar Terminal due to heavy load of trains on Hazrat Nizamuddin.

It operates as train number 12569 from Jainagar to Anand Vihar Terminal and as train number 12570 in the reverse direction serving the states of Bihar, Uttar Pradesh & Delhi.

It is part of the Garib Rath Express series launched by the former railway minister of India, Mr. Laloo Prasad Yadav .

Coaches

The 12569 / 70 Jainagar Anand Vihar Garib Rath Express has 20 AC 3 tier and 2 End on Generator Coaches  . It does not carry a Pantry car coach.

As is customary with most train services in India, Coach Composition may be amended at the discretion of Indian Railways depending on demand.

Service

As the average speed of the train is above , as per Indian Railways rules, its fare includes a Superfast surcharge.

Routeing

The 12569 / 70 Jainagar Anand Vihar Garib Rath Express runs from Jainagar via Madhubani, Darbhanga Junction, Barauni Junction, Mokama Junction, Patna Junction, Ara Junction, Buxar, Mughalsarai Junction, Allahabad Junction, Kanpur Central Aligarh junction to Anand Vihar Terminal.

Traction

The  Ghaziabad or Gomoh Mughalsarai based WAP 4 or WAP 7 for its journey.

Operation

12569 Jainagar Anand Vihar Garib Rath Express leaves Jainagar every Monday & Friday arriving Anand Vihar Terminal the next day.
 
12570 Anand Vihar Jainagar Garib Rath Express leaves Anand Vihar Terminal every Tuesday & Saturday arriving Jainagar the next day.

References 

 https://web.archive.org/web/20151213212015/http://www.indianrail.gov.in/garibrath_trn_list.html
 http://www.nr.indianrailways.gov.in/view_detail.jsp?dcd=2771&id=0,4,268
 
 https://www.youtube.com/watch?v=MCPmUySAu2A

External links

Transport in Jainagar
Transport in Delhi
Garib Rath Express trains
Rail transport in Bihar
Rail transport in Delhi
Rail transport in Uttar Pradesh
Railway services introduced in 2008